Bogdan Lucian Aurescu (born 9 September 1973) is a Romanian diplomat serving as the minister of foreign affairs in the Ciucă Cabinet since 25 November 2021. 

He was Presidential Advisor for Foreign Policy to the President of Romania from May 2016 to November 2019 and Foreign Affairs Minister from November 2014 to November 2015. Previously, he held the position of Secretary of State in the Romanian MFA – Secretary of State for Strategic Affairs (2009–2010, 2012–2014), Secretary of State for European Affairs (2004–2005, 2010–2012) and Secretary of State for Global Affairs (2012).

Between 2004 and 2009, Aurescu was his country's chief counsel (Agent of Romania) in the Maritime Delimitation in the Black Sea case, a boundary dispute with Ukraine that Romania brought before the International Court of Justice. 

Between 2010 and 2011, he was the head of the Romanian delegation for the negotiations on the Romanian-American Ballistic Missile Defense Agreement, and of the Joint Declaration on the Strategic Partnership for the 21st Century between Romania and USA. 

In November 2016, he was elected by the United Nations General Assembly as member of the UN International Law Commission for a five years’ mandate (2017–2021).

He is also Professor of Public International Law at the Faculty of Law, University of Bucharest, having started his teaching activity in 1998.

Controversies
Adrian Năstase promoted Bogdan Aurescu to the post of Undersecretary of State and later, to the Secretary of State. Aurescu was Năstase's assistant at the Faculty of Law of the University of Bucharest for the Public International Law discipline and they wrote together several legal treaties. In 2004, the Aurescu candidature was delegated by the Social Democratic Party (PSD) in Dâmbovița County for the Parliament elections but he did not win.

In November 2014, Adrian Năstase attended an event called by the Ministry of Foreign Affairs and Minister Bogdan Aurescu. Recently released from prison, where he was imprisoned being sentenced twice for the corruption offenses, Năstase was next to Aurescu, who had just been appointed Foreign Minister, at a book launch event. In April 2015, former Prime Minister and Foreign Minister Adrian Năstase, who was twice sentenced for prison, returned to the Government, more precisely to the Ministry of Foreign Affairs, at the invitation of the acting minister Bogdan Aurescu to the meeting of an advisory council. The ministry led by Aurescu then argued that the invitation was made "because of his rich institutional and professional expertise".

In June 2015, Prime Minister Victor Ponta was charged by the National Anticorruption Directorate for several corruption offenses. At that time, Bogdan Aurescu was a member of the Ponta Government and remained in office until November 2015, when Victor Ponta resigned.

References

External links
Bogdan Lucian Aurescu at the Ministry of Foreign Affairs site

|-

1973 births
Living people
People from Bucharest
Romanian Ministers of Foreign Affairs
Academic staff of the University of Bucharest
Members of the International Law Commission